Lolog Lake is a glacial lake located in the department of Neuquén, in Argentina.

The lake can be accessed by two roads that connect it to the nearby cities Junín de los Andes and San Martín de los Andes.

This lake is a prestigious zone for trout fishing.

References

Glacial lakes of Argentina
Lakes of Neuquén Province